Nguon may be,

Nguon event
Nguồn language
Nguon Hong
Nguon Nhel (1942-2021), Cambodian politician
Nguon Kang